Gongylidioides is a genus of Asian dwarf spiders that was first described by R. Oi in 1960.

Species
 it contains eighteen species, found in China, India, Japan, Korea, Malaysia, Russia, Taiwan, and Vietnam:
Gongylidioides acmodontus Tu & Li, 2006 – China
Gongylidioides angustus Tu & Li, 2006 – Taiwan
Gongylidioides communis Saito & Ono, 2001 – Japan
Gongylidioides cucullatus Oi, 1960 (type) – Japan
Gongylidioides diellipticus Song & Li, 2008 – Taiwan
Gongylidioides foratus (Ma & Zhu, 1990) – China
Gongylidioides galeritus Saito & Ono, 2001 – Japan
Gongylidioides griseolineatus (Schenkel, 1936) – Russia (Far East), China
Gongylidioides kaihotsui Saito & Ono, 2001 – Japan, Korea
Gongylidioides keralaensis Tanasevitch, 2011 – India
Gongylidioides kouqianensis Tu & Li, 2006 – China
Gongylidioides lagenoscapis Yin, 2012 – China
Gongylidioides monocornis Saito & Ono, 2001 – Japan
Gongylidioides onoi Tazoe, 1994 – China, Vietnam, Japan
Gongylidioides pectinatus Tanasevitch, 2011 – India, Malaysia
Gongylidioides protegulus Tanasevitch & Marusik, 2019 – Taiwan
Gongylidioides rimatus (Ma & Zhu, 1990) – Russia (Far East), China
Gongylidioides ussuricus Eskov, 1992 – Russia (Far East), China, Korea

See also
 List of Linyphiidae species (A–H)

References

Araneomorphae genera
Linyphiidae
Spiders of Asia
Spiders of Russia